Taluka Haveli is a subdivision of the district of Pune, Maharashtra. The Pune Municipal Corporation & Pimpri Chinchwad Municipal Corporation, Pune are at the center of & entirely surrounded by the taluka for administrative purposes. The region of Pune Metropolitan Region has claimed the major part of the same.

See also
 Talukas in Pune district

References

Talukas in Pune district